Warwick John Tecklenburg is a former South African rugby union player, who played first class rugby between 2011 and 2016. He also played for Kamaishi Seawaves in the Japanese Top League East. His usual position is flanker.

He retired at the start of 2017 to join his family's farming business.

Career

He made his first team debut for the Blue Bulls against  in the 2011 Currie Cup Premier Division season.

He also represented  in the Varsity Cup.

He joined Japanese Top League side Kamaishi Seawaves for the 2015–2016 season.

References

South African rugby union players
Living people
1987 births
Blue Bulls players
Golden Lions players
Lions (United Rugby Championship) players
People from Mbombela
Rugby union flankers
Kamaishi Seawaves players
South African expatriate rugby union players
Expatriate rugby union players in Japan
South African expatriate sportspeople in Japan
Rugby union players from Mpumalanga